The fossil trade is the purchase and sale of fossils. This is many times done illegally with stolen fossils, and many important scientific specimens are lost each year. The trade is lucrative, and many celebrities collect fossils.

The fossil trade has attracted criticism from many paleontologists, who regard the private ownership of fossils to be damaging to science.

History

The auction of the Tyrannosaurus skeleton known as Sue in 1997 for $8.3 million is considered to have caused an increased interest in the fossil trade. According to the head of science and natural history at Christie's, James Hyslop, the market in fossils has been growing consistently since 2007. Due to the increased awareness of the lucrative nature of fossils, many landowners have become more reluctant to work with scientists, preferring to instead offer prospecting rights to the highest bidder.

The international trade in fossils for use in alternative medicine, commonly referred to as "dragon bone", was worth US$700 million annually as of 2010.

Fossil poaching is common in Mongolia. In five years, the United States Immigration and Customs Enforcement seized $44 million worth of smuggled fossils. Fossils from Mongolia and China, which are illegal to export, are often claimed to be from Central Asia.

Fossils sold through the fossil trade are often composites of multiple specimens, not necessarily from a single species, combined to look like one skeleton.

Legality
In the United States, it is legal to sell fossils collected on private land. In Mongolia, Brazil, and China, the export of fossils is illegal.

Ethics and controversy

The Society of Vertebrate Paleontology, an international association of professional and amateur vertebrate paleontologists, believes that scientifically important fossils—especially but not exclusively those found on public lands—should be held in perpetuity in the public trust, preferably in a museum or research institution, where they can benefit the scientific community as a whole as well as future generations. In the United States, Paleontological Resources Preservation Act. S. 546 and H. R. 2416 were introduced in the US Congress with SVP's full support.

Many commercial fossil collectors and dealers believe that such policies are a breach of their rights. The argument has also been put forth that there are too few professional paleontologists to collect and preserve fossils currently exposed to the elements, and that it is therefore essential that private citizens be allowed to collect them for the sake of their preservation. Eric Scott, the Curator of Paleontology for the San Bernardino County Museum, argues that 1) private citizens and amateur (not for profit) collectors can and do participate frequently in the permitted recovery and preservation of significant vertebrate fossils, and 2) preservation of significant fossils does not require or mandate sale of those fossils.

The Society of Vertebrate Paleontology's by-laws state that the society does not condone the trade of scientifically significant vertebrate fossils, except for the purpose of keeping fossils in the public trust.

Notable incidents

A hoax specimen composed of parts of genuine Yanornis and Microraptor fossils obtained by a museum through the fossil trade was originally interpreted as a "missing link" between dinosaurs and birds and planned to be named "Archaeoraptor", but was identified as a hoax before being formally published in a scientific journal.

A Tyrannosaurus skeleton nicknamed "Stan" sold at an auction in 2020 for $31.8 million, a record-setting price.

The skull of a Tyrannosaurus relative called Tarbosaurus bataar illegally exported from Mongolia was purchased by the actor Nicolas Cage for $276,000 in 2007. When contacted by U.S. authorities, Cage voluntarily handed over the specimen for repatriation to Mongolia.

A smuggled skeleton of Tarbosaurus bataar, which is also called Tyrannosaurus bataar, was the subject of the in rem case United States v. One Tyrannosaurus Bataar Skeleton.

The holotype specimen of the dinosaur Halszkaraptor had been obtained through the fossil trade. Due to its provenance, several scientists initially expressed concern that it was a hoax, but scanning suggests the specimen was not tampered with.

See also
Antiquities trade
List of dinosaur specimens sold at auction

References

Fossil trade
Trade by commodity